Jaromír Jágr (born 15 February 1972) is a Czech professional ice hockey right winger for and the owner of Rytíři Kladno of the Czech Extraliga (ELH). He previously played in the National Hockey League (NHL) for the Pittsburgh Penguins, Washington Capitals, New York Rangers, Philadelphia Flyers, Dallas Stars, Boston Bruins, New Jersey Devils, Florida Panthers and Calgary Flames, serving as captain of the Penguins and the Rangers, between 1990 and 2018. After leaving the Rangers in 2008, he played three seasons in the Kontinental Hockey League (KHL) with Avangard Omsk. He returned to the NHL in 2011 with the Flyers and remained in the league for seven more years before being assigned by the Flames in 2018 to HC Kladno. Having played in 35 professional seasons (as of 2023) and over 2,000 professional games, Jágr has had one of the longest careers in professional ice hockey history. He is the most productive European player who has ever played in the NHL and is widely regarded as one of the greatest players of all time.

Jágr has the second-most points in NHL history, after Wayne Gretzky. In 1990, at age 18, he was the youngest player in the NHL. Until his transfer, at age 45, he was the oldest player in the NHL, and is the oldest player to record a hat-trick. In 2017, Jágr was named one of the 100 Greatest NHL Players in history.

Jágr was the fifth overall selection in the 1990 NHL Entry Draft. He won consecutive Stanley Cups in the 1991 and 1992 seasons with the Penguins. Individually, he has won the Art Ross Trophy as the NHL scoring champion five times (four times in a row), the Lester B. Pearson Award for the NHL's outstanding player as voted by the NHL Players' Association (NHLPA) three times and the Hart Memorial Trophy as the league's most valuable player once, while finishing second four times.

Jágr is a member of the Triple Gold Club, individuals who have played for teams that have won the Stanley Cup (1991, 1992), the Ice Hockey World Championships (2005, 2010) and the Olympic gold medal in ice hockey (1998). Jágr is one of only two Czech players (the other being Jiří Šlégr) in the Club, achieving this feat in 2005. Jágr was the Czech Republic's flag bearer at the 2010 Winter Olympics. Jágr is also one of only three players from 1981 to 2001 to win the Art Ross Trophy as the leading point-scorer during the regular season; the others are Wayne Gretzky and Mario Lemieux. Jágr has won the award more times than any other non-Canadian player. He is a member of the Czech Ice Hockey Hall of Fame.

Playing career
Jágr began skating at age three, and he immediately showed exceptional abilities. At age 15, he was playing at the highest level of competition in Czechoslovakia for Poldi SONP Kladno, and when he was 17, he became the youngest member of the Czechoslovakia national team.

As a youth in his native country, he kept a photograph of American president Ronald Reagan in his school gradebook, in detest of the policies of the Soviet Union.

Pittsburgh Penguins (1990–2001)
Jágr was the first Czechoslovak player to be drafted by the NHL without first having to defect to the West; his selection in the NHL draft came as the Iron Curtain was falling. Because of this, after Jágr was selected by the Pittsburgh Penguins with the fifth overall pick in the 1990 NHL Entry Draft, he was able to immediately relocate to North America from Czechoslovakia. When he attended the draft, in Vancouver, he was the first Czechoslovak player present at the NHL draft with his government's blessings.

Jágr was a supporting player with the powerhouse Penguins that won back-to-back Stanley Cups in 1991 and 1992. He was one of the youngest players in NHL history, at age 20, to score a goal in the Stanley Cup Finals.

Before he had a clear grasp of the English language, Jágr could be heard reading the daily weather forecast on Pittsburgh radio station WDVE in his broken, thickly-accented English. He and teammate (and fellow countryman) Jiří Hrdina were promoted as the "Czechmates", a play on the term "checkmate" from chess. He would also play Scrabble in an attempt to increase his English vocabulary. Some Penguins fans realized that the letters in his first name could be scrambled to form the anagram "Mario Jr.", a reference to teammate Mario Lemieux.

In the 1994–95 season, Jágr won his first Art Ross Trophy after finishing the regular season with the most points in the NHL; he tied Eric Lindros with 70 points but won based on his 32 goals to Lindros' 29. The next year, Jágr set a record for most points, 149, by a European-born player. Both his 62 goals and 87 assists from that season still stand as career-highs. His 1995–96 totals for assists and points stand as the records for right-wingers in those categories. After the 1997–98 season, Penguins captain Ron Francis signed with the Carolina Hurricanes, leaving Jágr the Penguins' captaincy. From 1997–98 to 2000–01, Jágr would win four-straight NHL scoring titles. In 1999, he would win the Hart Memorial Trophy as the NHL's most valuable player, as well as the Lester B. Pearson Award. In 1998, he led the Czech Republic to a gold medal at the 1998 Winter Olympics.

On 30 December 1999, against the New York Islanders, Jágr scored three goals and four assists for a career-high seven-point night. He would later match this feat on 11 January 2003 by once again scoring three goals and four assists in a game against the Florida Panthers as a member of the Washington Capitals.

In 2000–01, Jágr was struggling to find his scoring touch and faced criticisms about his relationship with Penguins head coach Ivan Hlinka. With the return of Mario Lemieux from retirement, the Penguins had two superstars, but friction developed between the two; Jágr held the captaincy but many fans regarded Lemieux as the talisman of the team. Additionally, the struggling, medium-market Penguins could, with Lemieux back, no longer hope to afford Jágr's high salary. Thus, on 11 July 2001, the organization traded him, along with František Kučera, to the Washington Capitals in exchange for Kris Beech, Michal Sivek and Ross Lupaschuk.

In 806 games with Pittsburgh, Jágr became only the second player (after Lemieux) to score 1,000 points as a Penguin. Jágr sits second behind Lemieux in career goals in franchise history and third in games played, assists and points, having since been surpassed by Sidney Crosby.

Washington Capitals (2001–2004)
Later in 2001, the Capitals signed Jágr to the then-largest contract ever in NHL history at $77 million over seven years, an average annual value of $11 million, with an option for an eighth year. However, Jágr did not live up to expectations in Washington, as the Capitals failed to defend their division title and missed the 2002 Stanley Cup playoffs. For the first time during his tenure with the Capitals, Jágr failed to finish among the NHL's top scorers, help his team qualify for the Stanley Cup playoffs, or make the NHL All-Star team. During the summer of 2002, the Capitals reunited Jágr with former teammate Robert Lang. In 2002–03, Washington finished sixth overall in the Eastern Conference but lost to the upstart Tampa Bay Lightning in the first round of the 2003 playoffs despite winning the series' first two games.

The lack of organizational success prompted the Capitals to unload much of their high-priced talent in order to save money—not just a cost-cutting spree, but also an acknowledgement that their attempt to build a contender with high-priced veteran talent had failed. Disgruntled, Washington ownership spent much of 2003 trying to trade Jágr, but a year before a new Collective Bargaining Agreement (CBA) was to be signed, few teams were willing to risk $11 million on Jágr.

On 23 January 2004, Jágr was eventually traded to the New York Rangers in exchange for Anson Carter and an agreement that Washington would pay approximately $4 million per year of Jágr's salary. Jágr also agreed to defer (with interest) $1 million per year for the remainder of his contract to allow the trade to go through.

New York Rangers (2004–2008)

Due to the new CBA signed before the start of the 2005–06 season, Jágr's salary was reduced to $7.8 million, the maximum allowed under the terms of the new salary cap.

During the NHL labor dispute in 2004–05, he had played for HC Kladno in the Czech Republic, and afterward for Avangard Omsk in the Russian Superleague (RSL).

Jágr led the Czech Republic to gold at the 2005 World Hockey Championships in Austria and was elected a tournament all-star in the process. He also became a member of hockey's prestigious Triple Gold Club, players who have won a Stanley Cup, a World Hockey Championship and an Olympic gold medal.

Prior to the 2005–06 season, the Rangers had missed the playoffs for seven consecutive seasons. Following the fire sale of the high-priced, underachieving veterans that made up the team's roster (as well as the retirement of long-time captain Mark Messier), many experts picked the Rangers to be the worst team in the NHL. Jágr disagreed and promised the team would surprise a lot of people and make the Stanley Cup playoffs. He started strong during the beginning of the 2005 season and the return from the lockout of the NHL. He became only the fourth player in NHL history to score ten or more goals in less than ten games at the start of a season. His return to dominance helped the Rangers return to the Stanley Cup playoffs, but injuries to Jágr and others contributed to a four-game sweep in the first round by the New Jersey Devils.

Jágr scored his 1,400th point on a power-play goal against the Philadelphia Flyers on 2 March 2006, pushing him past Jari Kurri into second place all-time among European-born players. He later passed Stan Mikita to become the all-time leader.

On 18 March 2006, against the Toronto Maple Leafs, Jágr became only the sixth Rangers player in team history to break the 100-point barrier, and became the only Ranger right winger to score 100 points in a season.

On 27 March 2006, against the Buffalo Sabres, Jágr had a goal and an assist, which tied both the Rangers' single-season goal record of 52 (Adam Graves, 1993–94) and the Rangers' single-season points record of 109 (Jean Ratelle, 1971–72). Two nights later, on 29 March, Jágr passed Ratelle when he assisted on Petr Průcha's first-period goal against the New York Islanders' Rick DiPietro. On 8 April, against the Boston Bruins, Jágr scored his NHL-leading 53rd goal of the season, breaking the Rangers' single-season goals record.

After leading the NHL in points and goals for most of the 2005–06 season, Jágr was surpassed by the San Jose Sharks' duo of Joe Thornton (125 points) and Jonathan Cheechoo (56 goals), losing both the Art Ross and Maurice Richard trophies in the final week of the season. Jágr finished with 123 points, 54 goals and 24 power-play goals, second in the NHL in all three categories. He also finished third in the NHL in both assists (69) and plus-minus (+34). However, just as in Washington, playoff success was not to be for Jágr, whose Rangers were swept in four games by New Jersey. In the series, he suffered a dislocated shoulder in the third period of the first game of the series, which kept him from playing at his top form for the rest of the series. Jágr had surgery on the shoulder after the Rangers were eliminated from the playoffs.

Despite being inched out by Joe Thornton for the Art Ross Trophy and Hart Trophy (league MVP), Jágr won his third Lester B. Pearson Award as the NHL's most outstanding player. During his acceptance speech for the Award, Jágr said, "With this award, you get voted on by players you play against every night and I think they understand the game better than the media." He has been named to seven NHL first All-Star teams.

On 5 October 2006, before the first game of the 2006–07 season (against his former team Washington), Jágr was named as the 24th captain in the history of the New York Rangers, replacing Mark Messier, who had retired before the 2005–06 season. Jágr then proceeded to score a goal on his first shift in the game, just under 30 seconds into the new season.

Jágr scored his 600th career NHL goal on 19 November 2006 against Tampa Bay goaltender Johan Holmqvist, making him the 16th player in NHL history to do so. Power play linemate Brendan Shanahan had scored his 600th goal almost three weeks earlier, making them the first teammates in NHL history to score their 600th goal in the same season.

On 10 February 2007, against Washington, Jágr earned an assist on a goal by Michal Rozsíval to record his 1,500th career point. He is only the 12th NHLer to reach this mark, and the fourth-fastest player to do so after Marcel Dionne, Mario Lemieux and Wayne Gretzky.

On 5 April 2007, against the Montreal Canadiens, Jágr scored his 30th goal of the 2006–07 season to record 15 consecutive seasons of 30 or more goals, tying the NHL record held by Mike Gartner.

After a regular season slowed by a weak shoulder, Jágr then led the New York Rangers to a sweep of the Atlanta Thrashers in the Eastern Conference Quarterfinals, the Rangers would fall to the Buffalo Sabres in Game 6 of the Conference Semifinals.

On 14 November 2007, against New Jersey, Jágr scored his fourth goal of the 2007–08 season at the Prudential Center in Newark, making him the first player to score a goal in 53 different NHL arenas.

Avangard Omsk (2008–2011)

On 3 July 2008, Jágr, an unrestricted free agent for the first time in his career, was informed by Rangers general manager Glen Sather that the club would not offer him a new contract. Sather admitted that the two sides never engaged in detailed negotiations for a new contract, and that after many months of speculation, Jágr was "seriously considering" going to Russia to finish his career, despite offers from other NHL teams. Jágr expressed a desire to possibly finish out his career at his father's club, HC Kladno. On 4 July, Jágr agreed to a two-year contract with Avangard Omsk of the Kontinental Hockey League (KHL); the contract was reported to pay Jágr the equivalent of US$5 million annually.

Jágr was named Avangard's captain on 30 January 2009. As a member of Avangard, Jágr was sitting next to Alexei Cherepanov, a first-round pick of the New York Rangers, who died during a game against Vityaz Chekhov. They were discussing the past shift when the 19-year-old Cherepanov collapsed onto Jágr on the bench at the Ice Hockey Center 2004 in Chekov.

In April 2009, Jágr publicly stated an interest in returning to the NHL, stating that he really just needed a break from the pressures of an 82-game NHL schedule. Jágr, who claimed to have lost 15 pounds since his last NHL season, and who was "practicing a lot harder than [he] ever did in [his] life", stated that he would be interested in joining the Edmonton Oilers because of the interest they showed in July 2008. However, following the expiration of his initial contract with Avangard, Jágr signed a new contract with Avangard for the 2010–11 season.

Philadelphia Flyers, Dallas Stars, and Boston Bruins (2011–2013)

On 1 July 2011, Jágr returned to the NHL, but rather than signing with his original NHL team in Pittsburgh, he signed a one-year, $3.3 million contract with the Philadelphia Flyers, the Penguins' cross-state rival. He scored his 1,600th NHL point during his debut game with the Flyers, assisting on a Claude Giroux goal as the Flyers won their season opener 2–1 over the Boston Bruins on 6 October 2011. Typically playing on the first line with Giroux and Scott Hartnell, Jágr was among the top scorers during the start of the 2011–12 season. He scored his first and second goals as a Flyer on 24 October against the Toronto Maple Leafs. On 29 October 2011, against the Carolina Hurricanes, he scored his 650th and 651st NHL goals. He scored his only goal of the 2012 playoffs during Philadelphia's series against Pittsburgh. The Flyers were eliminated by the New Jersey Devils, who would ultimately become the 2012 Eastern Conference champions.

On 3 July 2012, Jágr signed a one-year contract with the Dallas Stars reportedly worth $4.5 million. The signing marked Jágr's first time playing for a club in the Western Conference. Jágr said during a conference call two days later that the Montreal Canadiens had been his first choice as a free agent. "I always wanted to play in Canada and I wanted to go to Montreal if I had a chance, but Montreal wasn't interested," Jágr said. "All of a sudden I got a phone call from Stars' general manager Joe Nieuwendyk that Dallas was interested."

During the 2012–13 NHL lockout, Jágr played for his own team, Rytíři Kladno, in the Czech Extraliga. During the lockout, he scored 24 goals and 33 assists in 34 games and, before leaving Kladno for the Stars, was in second place of Czech Extraliga's scoring list. After the NHL lockout ended, he made his debut as a Star on 19 January 2013, when he tallied two goals and two assists in a 4–3 victory over the Phoenix Coyotes.

Jágr reached the 1,000-assist mark on 29 March 2013 in a game against the Minnesota Wild, becoming just the 12th player to do so and the first non-Canadian NHLer to reach the milestone.

On 2 April 2013, Jágr was traded to the Boston Bruins in exchange for Lane MacDermid, Cody Payne and a conditional third-round pick in the 2013 NHL Entry Draft. He made his Bruins debut on 4 April, scoring the lone goal in Boston's 1–0 win over the New Jersey Devils, and with his second Bruins goal, the first scored in a 3–0 shutout over the Florida Panthers on 21 April 2013, Jágr tied the record for the most game-winning goals in an NHL career (118), previously set by Phil Esposito.

When Jágr played in the first game of the 2013 Stanley Cup Finals, he set a new record for the longest gap between Finals appearances at 21 years, surpassing the previous record of 19 years, which was established by Gary Roberts in 2008; coincidentally, both instances involved someone with the Penguins at one end of those streaks. Also coincidental was that, as in his previous Stanley Cup appearance, Jágr's opponents were the Chicago Blackhawks. After the Bruins lost the Finals to Chicago, the team announced on 26 June 2013 that they did not intend to offer Jágr a new contract.

New Jersey Devils (2013–2015)
On 22 July 2013, Jágr signed a one-year contract with the New Jersey Devils; the contract included $2 million guaranteed and another $2 million as an incentive bonus if Jágr was to play in at least 40 games. Jágr, at age 41, hoped to help the Devils overcome the loss of Ilya Kovalchuk, who had previously departed for the KHL. Jágr scored his first goal as a Devil on 7 October 2013 in a 5–4 shootout loss to the Edmonton Oilers. The goal came on the 23rd anniversary of his first NHL goal which, coincidentally, was against the Devils.

On 21 November 2013, Jágr tied Gordie Howe's record of game-winning goals with 121, with his 690th goal, which tied him in ninth place (with former teammate Mario Lemieux) for all-time goal-scoring leaders. On 20 December, he scored his 693rd goal, putting him in eighth place over Steve Yzerman. A day later, Jágr tied Mark Messier for seventh place in NHL history for goals scored with 694. Later in the season, on 14 January 2014, he scored his 695th goal, passing Messier, putting him 14 goals away from passing Mike Gartner. On 1 March, Jágr scored his 700th career NHL goal as the Devils won 6–1 against the New York Islanders at Nassau Veterans Memorial Coliseum. On 8 April, near the conclusion of the Devils' season, he was awarded the New Jersey Devils MVP Award at their annual team awards ceremony. He scored two points in his final game of the season (two assists in the third period), surpassing Gordie Howe for eighth place on the NHL's all-time list for career assists and tying Steve Yzerman for sixth on the all-time points list at 1,755. Jágr finished the season as the team's leading scorer, with his highest points total in a season since 2007–08. Jágr's play led the Devils to re-sign him to another one-year contract on 30 April. He became the joint sixth-highest scorer in NHL history in November 2014 after scoring his 708th NHL goal for the Devils against Boston. On 8 December, in his 1,500th NHL game, he moved ahead of Marcel Dionne for fifth place on the NHL's all-time points list with 1,772. On 3 January 2015, in a game against the Philadelphia Flyers, Jágr became the oldest player in NHL history to score a hat-trick at 42 years and 322 days. The record was previously held by Detroit Red Wings defenceman Nicklas Lidström.

Florida Panthers (2015–2017)
On 26 February 2015, Jágr was traded to the Florida Panthers in exchange for a second-round pick in the 2015 NHL Entry Draft and a third-round pick in 2016. He made his team debut on 28 February in a 5–3 Panthers win over the Buffalo Sabres and registered his first points with the team in the following game on 1 March, posting a goal and an assist in a 4–3 win over the Tampa Bay Lightning. On 19 March, Jágr scored his 718th career goal against Detroit to move him past Phil Esposito and fifth on the all-time goal-scoring list. In a 9 April, 4–2 Panthers victory over the Bruins, Jágr registered two assists to give him 1,800 career points in the NHL and sole possession of fourth place on the all-time points list, surpassing former Penguins teammate Ron Francis. On 11 April, in the Panthers' season finale, Jágr reached 2,000 NHL points (including playoff games) when he assisted on a Jonathan Huberdeau goal. He then scored his 800th NHL goal (including playoffs) later in the third period. On 12 April, one day after the end of the 2014–15 regular season, Jágr signed a new one-year, $3.5 million contract with Florida for the 2015–16 season.

Jágr reached multiple milestones as a Panther. On 20 December 2015, he moved into fourth all-time on the NHL scoring list, scoring his 732nd goal to move past Marcel Dionne for fourth place in NHL history. On 4 February 2016, Jágr became the sixth player in NHL history to record 1,100 career assists. On 20 February, he scored his 742nd goal, surpassing Brett Hull for third place in NHL history. In a 7 March, 5–4 overtime loss to the Bruins, an assist on Aleksander Barkov's goal put Jágr at 1,851 career points, passing Gordie Howe on the all-time points list and putting him in sole possession of third place overall. With the Panthers qualifying for the 2016 playoffs, Jágr played in his first playoff series since the 2013 Stanley Cup Finals. Though he only registered two assists in the Panthers' six-game first-round exit to the Islanders (who would win their first playoff series since 1993), he became the fifth NHL player all-time to record 200 career playoff points.

At age 44, Jágr led the Panthers in scoring with 66 points. In reward for his strong play and leadership abilities, the team announced on 5 May 2016 that they had signed Jágr to a new one-year, $4 million contract.

On 20 October 2016, Jágr became the third player in NHL history to score 750 goals. On 22 December 2016, he scored his 1,888th career point, surpassing Mark Messier to become second in career points, and on 15 February 2017, his 45th birthday, he became the second player to register his 1,900th NHL point.

In 2017 on Twitter, as a free agent, Jágr tweeted: "FA 1994 - all GMs called, FA 2017- 0 calls" accompanied by a trophy emoji and a smiley emoji, as well as pictures taken in 1994 and 2017. In the 1994 picture, a smiling Jágr is on the phone with an unspecified general manager. In the 2017 picture, he is seen looking at his mobile phone with a puzzled expression on his face. The Panthers organization announced shortly after that they would not offer Jágr a new contract.

Calgary Flames (2017–2018)
On 4 October 2017, Jágr signed a one-year contract with the Calgary Flames. Jágr had indicated before that he would like to play professionally until age 50, but later said that it would be very likely that he would stop playing after the 2017–18 season, at which point he would be 46. He noted the tendency of teams to focus on younger players to the exclusion of older ones like himself, which he considers understandable and in light of which he remarked, "I was pretty lucky." The Flames were Jágr's ninth NHL team, but his first Canadian team, which prompted him to say, "I want to get the experience so I can one day say I played for a Canadian team. So I'm here."

On 9 November 2017 against the Detroit Red Wings, Jágr scored his first goal as a Flame, earning two points in a 6–3 win. However, on 6 January 2018, it was reported that Jágr and the Flames were negotiating the termination of his contract, as injuries had limited Jágr to a career-low seven points (including the aforementioned one goal) in 22 games. On 14 January 2018, Jágr was placed on the injured reserve, retroactive to 31 December 2017, while the Flames called up Ryan Lomberg from their American Hockey League (AHL) affiliate, the Stockton Heat, in his place. On 28 January, it was reported that Jágr was placed on waivers, signalling the end of his brief tenure with the Flames; he cleared waivers the following day and was assigned to Rytíři Kladno in the WSM Liga.

Return to Kladno (2018–present)
On 3 February 2018, Jágr played his first game for his hometown team, and his first game since 31 December 2017, playing nearly 20 minutes and recording three assists. In his fifth game for Kladno, he was injured and remained sidelined for the rest of the season with a knee injury. In order to be eligible for participation in the playoff finals, he played a few seconds in ten playoff games. On 14 May, Jágr announced his plans to remain with Kladno for his 30th professional season. On 19 April, Jágr scored four goals in one game as Kladno was promoted to the top-flight Czech Extraliga.

In 2022, at the age of 50 and spending most games in the dressing room, Jágr admitted he was considering retirement, being too busy with the team administration and lacking the motivation for the physically demanding game, saying that at most he will "have to force myself to go play" in the alumni game of the 2023 NHL Winter Classic featuring the Penguins.

Off-ice incidents
Although he has repeatedly denied that he has a gambling problem, Jágr admitted in 2003 that he settled debts totaling $950,000 with two internet gambling sites between 1998 and 2002. The first of these incidents centered on Belize-based website CaribSports and its owner, William Caesar, to which Jágr owed $500,000. Sports Illustrated reported that Jágr agreed to make monthly payments to Caesar to settle the debt, and Caesar leaked the story to the press when Jágr stopped making payments. In 2003, the Internal Revenue Service (IRS) filed a $3.27 million lien against him for unpaid taxes for the 2001 tax year. Only a few months before, Jágr had settled a $350,000 claim for taxes dating to 1999. In the summer of 2006, Jágr sued his former accountant over a tax form that was supposed to have been filed in 2003, claiming that the form would have saved him $6 million had it been timely filed.

In May 2022, Jágr was a part of a traffic incident when his Kia collided with a tram. No one was injured in the accident.

Personal life
Jágr resides in the Czech Republic during the off-season. His father, also named  (1940–2022), owned a chain of hotels and served as president of HC Kladno.
Jágr wears the number 68, which he has worn through his entire career, in honour of the Prague Spring that occurred in Czechoslovakia in 1968 and his grandfather, who died while in prison that same year, and had earlier been imprisoned for opposing the collectivization of his farm in the post-war Communist takeover of Czechoslovakia. In any interviews when asked about his number, Jágr explains that he wears it not due to bad relations with Russian people, but rather due to disaffection with Communism. During his time with the New Jersey Devils, Jágr was granted special exception to keep wearing number 68, as then-general manager Lou Lamoriello had a policy in place which generally forbade players from wearing any number higher than 35. Jágr names former United States President Ronald Reagan as his hero for his work towards ending communism in Europe.

Jágr has been a long-time supporter of the liberal conservative Civic Democratic Party (ODS), stating in 2004 that he "had always" voted for the party. In the previous election, he appeared on the party's billboards and was among its sponsors. On 26 May 2010, Jágr announced that he was backing the Civic Democrats and its leader Petr Nečas. At the press conference, he said, "I realize that there will be elections in two to three days. I would like their outcome to be good." He also urged the party not to forget about sports when distributing money. "We all know what would happen if the young did not practice any sport. If children practice some sport, they do not have time for other things such as alcohol."

Jágr is an Orthodox Christian; he was baptized in 2001 by Prague's metropolitan. He began to speak more publicly about his faith during his three-year stint in Russia, a historically Orthodox nation.

Jágr's longevity in the NHL has spawned a fan club known as "The Traveling Jagrs", a group of hockey fans from the Alberta cities of Calgary and Camrose who share interest in the player. The group dresses in the sweater, hockey socks and pant shells of 11 of Jágr's teams (his nine NHL teams, the NHL All-Star team and the Czech national team) plus long black wigs in reference to Jágr's traditional hair-style. Usually, the club would travel once or twice a year to see him play in person, but after Jágr signed with the Flames, they announced that they would be a more regular fixture at games.

International play

Jágr has represented his country many times. In 1994, he and Pittsburgh Penguins teammate Martin Straka arrived in the middle of the 1994 World Championships after Pittsburgh's elimination from the Stanley Cup playoffs. Czech fans' expectations were high as Jágr was an NHL star, but before the team was able to integrate him into the team, the Czechs lost their quarterfinal game and were eliminated from tournament. Jágr was also hurt in numerous other games.

The 1996 World Cup of Hockey also did not see Jágr at his best. His performance was hampered by the flu and it only underscored the poor play of the whole team — after losing 7–3 to Finland, 3–0 to Sweden and even 7–1 to a relatively weak Germany, the team did not qualify for the tournament's playoffs.

The team's recent failures, however, were mitigated in 1998 when the Czech Republic won the men's gold medal in the 1998 Winter Olympics in Nagano, Japan. It was only the third gold medal for Czech or Czechoslovak sportsmen from the Winter Olympics and it is still fondly remembered.

Jágr did not play in the 1996, 1999, 2000 nor 2001 World Championships in which the Czech Republic won the gold medals. He was, however, a member of the team at the 2004 World Championship in Prague, where the expectations were high. However, after the team won all the games in the group, they lost in the quarterfinals game, stumbling out of the tournament.

It was the 2005 edition of the tournament that finally brought a gold medal to Jágr. Although he broke his finger in an early game against Germany, he played with it bandaged during the rest of the tournament and led his team to victory.

More injuries struck Jágr in the 2006 Winter Olympics in Turin. He was injured after a hit from Finland's Jarkko Ruutu, requiring stitches to his eyebrow. However, the injury was not as serious as first anticipated, and Jágr was able to play in the following games, though he was unable to finish the bronze medal game due to muscle injury. Despite the trouble, Jágr won his second-career Olympic medal, the bronze. In 2010, Jágr was his nation's flag bearer at the 2010 Winter Olympics, but in the men's ice hockey tournament, the Czechs finished a disappointing seventh after a defeat in the quarterfinals to Finland. Jágr again represented his country at the 2014 Winter Olympics in Sochi, scoring two goals and one assist in five games as the Czech Republic again lost in the quarterfinals.

After losing to Sweden in a battle for a bronze medal on 2014 IIHF World Championship in Minsk, Jágr announced the end of his career in international play with the Czech national team, focusing his efforts on returning to the NHL playoffs after New Jersey failed to qualify in 2014. However, Jágr stepped back from his decision after being called up to the Czech team for the 2015 IIHF World Championship in Prague and Ostrava, making the team's roster. On 1 May, he scored a goal in the Czechs' 6–5 loss to Sweden, his 50th for the national team, to become the oldest player to score at the World Championship.
In the Czech Republic's quarterfinal game against Finland, Jágr scored one assist and two goals, including the game-winning goal. At the end of the tournament, despite the Czechs' loss in the bronze medal game, Jágr was named the tournament's most valuable player.

NHL records

Most career game-winning goals – 135
Most career points by a right wing – 1921
Most career assists by a right wing – 1142
Most single-season points by a right wing – 149
Most single-season assists by a right wing – 87
Most single-season points by a European-born player – 149
Most single-season assists by a European-born player – 87
Most career assists by a European-born player – 1142
Most career points by a European-born player – 1921
Most career game-tying goals by a European-born player – 11 (tied with Teemu Selänne)
Most career playoff game-winning goals by a European-born player – 16
Most consecutive 30-goal seasons (1991–2007) – 15 (shared with Mike Gartner and Alexander Ovechkin; included the shortened 1994–95 season, 48 games)
Most consecutive 70-point seasons (15) (including the shortened 1994–95 NHL season, 48 games)
Longest gap between Stanley Cup Finals appearances – 21 years (1992–2013)
Only player to play in the Stanley Cup Finals as a teenager and at over 40 years of age
Oldest player to score 60 points in a season
Oldest player to score a hat-trick (42 years and 322 days old)
Most different teams played on by a 1000-point scorer - 9 (tied with Paul Coffey)

Pittsburgh Penguins records

Most single-season points by a right wing – 149
Most single-season assists by a right wing – 87
Most single-season assists by a European-born player – 87
Most single-season power-play goals by a European-born player – 20
Most single-season game-winning goals – 12
Most single-season shots on goal – 403
Most career points by a right wing – 1079
Most career points by a European-born player – 1079
Most career goals by a right wing – 439
Most career goals by a European-born player – 439
Most career assists by a right wing – 640
Most career assists by a European-born player – 640
Most career playoff game-winning goals – 78
Most career power-play goals by a right wing – 110
Most career power-play goals by a European-born player – 110
Most career shorthanded goals by a European-born player – 9
Most career overtime goals – 9
Most career game-tying goals – 10
Most career shots on goal by a right wing – 2911
Most career shots on goal by a European-born player – 2911
Most career playoff goals by a right wing – 65
Most career playoff goals by a European-born player – 65
Most career playoff points by a right wing – 147
Most career playoff points by a European-born player – 147
Most career playoff shorthanded goals by a right wing – 2 (tied with Ed Olczyk)
Most career playoff shorthanded goals by a European-born player – 2
Most career playoff game-winning goals – 14
Most career playoff overtime goals – 4
Most career playoff shots on goal – 461
Most career playoff power-play goals by a right wing – 19
Most career playoff power-play goals by a European-born player – 19

New York Rangers records
Most single-season goals (2005–06) – 54
Most single-season points (2005–06) – 123
Most single-season shots on goal (2005–06) – 368
Most single-season game-winning goals (2005–06) – 9 (tied with Mark Messier 1996–97 and Don Murdoch 1980–81)
Most single-season assists by a right wing (2005–06) – 69

NHL scoring achievements
Jágr is second in NHL career regular season points and is sixth in career playoff points.

He is also amongst the career leaders in several other major NHL regular season statistical categories: goals (4th), assists (5th), games played (4th), overtime goals (T-2nd), game-winning goals (1st), even-strength goals (3rd), power-play goals (T-11th), points per game (20th) and shots on goal (3rd).

Also amongst all-time leaders in NHL playoff statistical categories, Jágr ranks in the top 20 in points (6th), goals (11th), assists (10th), overtime goals (T-6th), game-winning goals (10th), games played (T-15th), power-play goals (T-19th) and shots on goal (6th).

Awards

NHL

Czech awards

International

KHL

Other

Career statistics

Regular season and playoffs
Bold indicates led league

International

References

Further reading

External links

 
 
 Jaromír Jágr stats at hokej.cz 
 

1972 births
Living people
Art Ross Trophy winners
Avangard Omsk players
Bill Masterton Memorial Trophy winners
Bolzano HC players
Boston Bruins players
Calgary Flames players
Converts to Eastern Orthodoxy
Czech anti-communists
Czech expatriate ice hockey players in Canada
Czech expatriate ice hockey players in Germany
Czech expatriate ice hockey players in Russia
Czech expatriate ice hockey players in the United States
Czech expatriate sportspeople in Italy
Czech ice hockey right wingers
Czechoslovak ice hockey right wingers
Dallas Stars players
Eastern Orthodox Christians from the Czech Republic
Expatriate ice hockey players in Italy
Florida Panthers players
Hart Memorial Trophy winners
Ice hockey players at the 1998 Winter Olympics
Ice hockey players at the 2002 Winter Olympics
Ice hockey players at the 2006 Winter Olympics
Ice hockey players at the 2010 Winter Olympics
Ice hockey players at the 2014 Winter Olympics
Lester B. Pearson Award winners
Medalists at the 1998 Winter Olympics
Medalists at the 2006 Winter Olympics
National Hockey League All-Stars
National Hockey League first-round draft picks
New Jersey Devils players
New York Rangers players
Olympic bronze medalists for the Czech Republic
Olympic gold medalists for the Czech Republic
Olympic ice hockey players of the Czech Republic
Olympic medalists in ice hockey
Philadelphia Flyers players
Pittsburgh Penguins draft picks
Pittsburgh Penguins players
Recipients of Medal of Merit (Czech Republic)
Rytíři Kladno players
Sportspeople from Kladno
Stanley Cup champions
Triple Gold Club
Washington Capitals players